Diana Laura Evangelista Chávez (born 5 November 1994) is a Mexican footballer who plays as a winger for Liga MX Femenil club Monterrey and the Mexico women's national team.

International career
In 2015 Evangelista represented Mexico at the Summer Universiade in Gwangju, South Korea. She made her debut for the senior Mexico women's national team on 12 December 2019, in a 6–0 friendly defeat by Brazil at Arena Corinthians in São Paulo.

References

External links
 
 

1994 births
Living people
Mexican women's footballers
Women's association football forwards
Footballers from Colima
Mexican footballers
People from Colima City
Liga MX Femenil players
Mexico women's international footballers